Sinchon Station is a station on the Gyeongui-Jungang Line. It was opened as a train station in 1921 and Seoul Metro traffic commenced in 2009.

References

External links
 Station information from Korail

Railway stations opened in 1921
Seoul Metropolitan Subway stations
Metro stations in Seodaemun District
Cultural Heritage of early modern times of South Korea